"Say Yes" is a song by performed by Floetry, issued as the second single from their debut studio album Floetic. It was written by lead singer Marsha Ambrosius along with Andre Harris, and was produced by Harris. The song was the group's only single to chart on the Billboard Hot 100, peaking at #24 in 2003.

In 2004, the song was nominated for a Grammy Award for Best R&B Performance by a Duo or Group with Vocal, but lost to "My Boo" by Usher and Alicia Keys. In 2012, Floetry member Natalie "The Floacist" Stewart recorded the song for her sophomore album Floetry Re:Birth. Smooth jazz musician and saxophonist Pamela Williams covered the song from her 2006 album Elixir.

Music video
The official music video for the song was directed by Jeremy Rall. The video begins with Marsha riding the subway along with other passengers. As she singing the song, she begins writing the lyrics of the song in her notebook. Meanwhile, Natalie is walking down the street and towards the subway station. She is seen passing various people including a professional skater (Cato Williams), a young couple, a young female soccer team, and a starving artist. Upon entering the subway station, Natalie is flattered by a puppeteer (E Reece) who performing a street puppet show. The video ends with Natalie catching the train and sitting next to Marsha as they ride away. A scene flips back to passengers of the train who deep in their own thought. Omari Hardwick makes a cameo appearance as an artist who is one of the passengers that appears to be drawing a picture of Marsha.

Chart positions

Weekly charts

Year-end charts

References

External links
 
 

2002 songs
2003 singles
DreamWorks Records singles
Floetry songs
Music videos directed by Jeremy Rall
Polydor Records singles
Songs written by Marsha Ambrosius
Songs written by Andre Harris
Soul ballads
2000s ballads